Farkhod Negmatov (born 22 November 1989 in Vahdat) is a Tajikistani taekwondo practitioner. He competed in the 80 kg event at the 2012 Summer Olympics and was eliminated in the preliminary round by Lutalo Muhammad.

References

External links

 

1989 births
Living people
Tajikistani male taekwondo practitioners
Olympic taekwondo practitioners of Tajikistan
Taekwondo practitioners at the 2012 Summer Olympics
Taekwondo practitioners at the 2010 Asian Games
Taekwondo practitioners at the 2014 Asian Games
Asian Games medalists in taekwondo
Asian Games bronze medalists for Tajikistan
Medalists at the 2014 Asian Games
Taekwondo practitioners at the 2018 Asian Games